Tomasch Calore (born 22 January 1997) is an Italian football player born in Pescara. He plays for Spoltore.

Club career
He made his Serie C debut for Teramo on 26 November 2016 in a game against Reggiana.

References

External links
 

1997 births
Sportspeople from Pescara
Footballers from Abruzzo
Living people
Italian footballers
Association football goalkeepers
Delfino Pescara 1936 players
S.S. Teramo Calcio players
Piacenza Calcio 1919 players
Serie C players
Serie D players